Ethan Snoreck, better known by his stage name Whethan (formerly Wheathin), is an American DJ and music producer from Chicago. He gained recognition after his remix of the track "XE3" by Mssingno, which as of December 2018 has garnered over 13 million plays on SoundCloud.

Early life 
Whethan attended Carl Sandburg High School from his freshman year until the first semester of his senior year. In May 2017, Whethan left high school early to tour with The Chainsmokers in 2017. He returned just long enough to attend his graduation ceremony at which he gave the entire school a preview of his unreleased work.

He first began releasing house music under his real name Ethan Snoreck, but became known as “Wheathin” because one of his early productions was a remix of a Wheat Thins jingle, which he created to prove to his friends that he could make music. The snack brand asked him to change his name in 2016. He chose Whethan He started producing music by 'messing around' on Garage Band on his iPad. He first became interested in music when he began rapping with his friend Trevor in 6th and 7th grade. Since then he listened to well-known musicians such as Daft Punk, Skrillex, and Deadmau5.

When he was 16 years old, he was recognized as the youngest ever producer to release a record on Australian EDM label, Future Classic. He later caught the attention of dubstep pioneer and Owsla-founder, Skrillex.

Career 
Whethan often incorporates a mix of indie future synths with electropop in his songs. His main influence is Flume, considered one of the pioneers of the future bass movement.

He frequently collaborates with Oliver Tree. The duo have released singles titled "All You Ever Talk About", "When I'm Down", "Enemy","Do You Feel Me?" and "Freefall" together. Whethan has also released "Can't Hide" and "Savage", featuring Ashe and Flux Pavilion and MAX, respectively. An official music video was released for the song "Can't Hide" which has over 2 million SoundCloud plays. The song also debuted at number one on Billboard's Spotify Viral 50 chart.

Whethan performed at SXSW music festival in March. He will also be performing at BUKU Music + Art Project festival, which fuses electronic music, hip hop and indie rock. Whethan toured with trap artists Flosstradamus in November alongside fellow DJs Slushii, Towkio, and Gent & Jawns.

In 2018, Whethan collaborated with pop singer Dua Lipa on the song "High", which was featured in the film Fifty Shades Freed. In March of the same year, he released the single "Be Like You" featuring Broods.

In 2020, he was set to perform at the Ultra Music Festival in Miami, but the festival was canceled due to the COVID-19 pandemic.

In 2022, he co-wrote the single "High" with The Chainsmokers for their return after a two-year break and helped produce and co-write half the album.

Discography

Albums

Extended plays

Singles

As lead artist

As featured artist

Other charted songs

Remixes

References 

American DJs
Electronic musicians
People from Chicago
1999 births
Living people
Dubstep musicians
Future bass musicians
Electronic dance music DJs